Naugawan Sadat is a town and a Tehsil in Naugawan Sadat & Amroha district in the Indian state of Uttar Pradesh.

Demographics       
 India census, Nowgawan Sadat had a population of 27,075. Males constituted 52% of the population and females 48%. Nowgawan Sadat has an average literacy rate of 84%, higher than the national average of 59.5%: male literacy is 91%, and female literacy is 51%. Children under six are 18% of the population. Nowgawan Sadat is dominated by Yadavs and Muslims. The constituency has 2.76 lakh voters, of which 95,000 are Muslims, 36,000 Yadavs and 25,000 SC. The constituency has an equal number of fragmented Jat, Gurjar and Chauhan voters.

Farming, specifically mango cultivation, and weaving are the primary industries in the area. Many residents and families have migrated to other parts of India and to other countries in search of work.

Schools in Nowgawan Sadat
>-Sahas Degree College
>-SAM Inter College
>-Shohrat Inter College
>-Askary Task College
>-Shohrat ITI
>-Fatima Girls Inter College
>-Sakina Primary School
>-Madarsa Babul Ilm
>-Madarsa Jamia Tul Muntazar
>-Madarsa Jamia Aliya Jafariya
>-Madarsa Ansar ul Uloom
>-Madarsa Noorul Madaris Junior High School
>-Madarsa Abdul Shakoor Islamia Arbia
>-ABBAS PUBLIC SCHOOL
>-Madarsa Sahara Public School
>-JTM Primary School
>-ABIDI SCHOOL
>-Fareedi Memorial Inter College
>-Kanya Junior High School

References 

Cities and towns in Amroha district